Paggi is a surname. Notable people with the name include:

Fernando Paggi (1914–1973), Swiss conductor and musician
Giovanni Battista Paggi (1554–1627),  Italian painter
Giovanni Battista Paggi (bishop), (1615–1663), Italian Roman Catholic bishop
Nicole Paggi (born 1977), American actress
Paola Paggi (born 1976), Italian volleyball player
Simona Paggi, Italian film editor